Fu Heng is one of the 19 constituencies in the Tai Po District of Hong Kong.

The constituency returns one district councillor to the Tai Po District Council, with an election every four years.

Fu Heng constituency has an estimated population of 15,546.

Councillors represented

Election results

2010s

References

Tai Po
Constituencies of Hong Kong
Constituencies of Tai Po District Council
1994 establishments in Hong Kong
Constituencies established in 1994